Daniel Fitzgerald "Danny" Reagan is a fictional NYPD Detective First Grade, and one of the main characters in the television series, Blue Bloods, being the eldest son of Commissioner Frank Reagan. He is portrayed by actor and New Kids on the Block singer Donnie Wahlberg.

Biography
The eldest son of the current New York City Police Commissioner Frank Reagan and his wife Mary, Danny grew up in Bay Ridge, Brooklyn with a younger sister, Erin, and two younger brothers, Joe and Jamie. He was happily married to Linda since 1996, with whom he has two sons, Jack (b. circa 2002) and Sean (b. circa 2004), until Linda's death off-screen between seasons 7 and 8. They lived on Staten Island until their home was destroyed in a fire in the season 7 finale, which was set by a drug cartel in retaliation to a recent bust Danny made. During high school, Danny dated Marianne Romano (Charisma Carpenter), who was described by his partner Baez as "the queen bee, super good looking, a little crazy, and dynamite in the sack" to which he agreed. As a young man, Danny worked construction.

In several episodes in the earlier seasons, it is clearly established in dialogue that Danny was the oldest of the siblings followed by Erin, Joe and Jamie in that order; Frank mentions that Danny was in diapers during the Watergate hearings which took place in 1973-74, while the final scene at the Reagan family plot in the episode "The Blue Templar" shows Joe's date of birth on his headstone as June 6, 1977. In later seasons, the writers appear to have retconned the order of birth. In the episode Common Ground, 2017, Frank states that Joe was his firstborn and that he misses him every day. He also stated that the boys were 19 months apart and Erin was their younger sister. Therefore, Joe is the oldest, then Danny, Erin and Jamie is the youngest.

For a class project of Nicky's, Danny mentioned that when he was three years old, he wanted to be a firefighter for Halloween, but his grandfather Henry swore that as long as he was alive, no Reagan would ever be a member of the FDNY, got him into a police uniform, and he "never took it off" until he made Detective.

On the job for 15 years (as of season 1), Danny took a leave of absence from the New York City Police Department to serve two tours in the Iraq War as a Marine. (He had enlisted and served in the Marines shortly after high school and prior to joining the NYPD, and either stayed in the Marine Corps Reserve and was activated, or volunteered to reenlist at the start of the war.) Danny saw combat in Fallujah, and was the only member of his platoon to come home alive (resulting in some post-traumatic stress). During his time in the Marines, Danny was decorated for heroism.

He is old-school; his hotheadedness and harsh methods of detective work sometimes get him in trouble, which his father worries about. When asked if his son "crosses the line" and violates procedure from time to time, Frank answered, "I think he walks on the line". Danny is hard on other policemen and detectives when he feels they are unprofessional or not doing their duty to its utmost. He is currently assigned to the Detective Squad of the 54th Precinct, and partnered with Detective Maria Baez. In "Most Wanted", it is mentioned that he leads the Manhattan South Detective Borough in both collars and complaints. In "Love Stories", he and Baez are awarded the NYPD Medal for Valor for their actions in "Partners".

As a detective with the NYPD, Danny carries a Kahr K9 in 9×19mm as his duty weapon, and drives a Dodge Charger on duty, which replaced his previous Chevrolet Impala 9C1. He also owns a Glock 19 in 9×19mm, and previously used a Smith & Wesson 5946 in 9×19mm. Danny drove a Jeep XJ Cherokee as his personal/family vehicle from Season 1 to Season 5, whilst Linda drove a rather troublesome 2001 Kia Sedona/Carnival; this vehicle was replaced when Henry lost his driver's license and gave Linda his car. In Season 6, Danny's Cherokee was replaced by a fourth-generation Ford Explorer.

Partners
Over his career, Danny has had numerous partners, with the show having cycled through various iterations until partnering with Maria Baez.
 Detective Darryl Reid (Malik Yoba) – As mentioned in a 2015 episode, Reid was partnered with Danny for "eight months seven years ago" (c. 2008). Reid's career came to an end (and put Danny's in jeopardy) when it was revealed that he planted evidence to secure a murder conviction.
 Detective DeMarcus King (Flex Alexander) – Was partnered with Danny in the pilot episode.
 Detective Ava Hotchkiss (Yvonna Kopacz Wright) – First partner of Danny's when he was assigned to Major Crimes. 
 Detective First Grade Jackie Curatola (Jennifer Esposito) – From 2010 until 2012, Danny was primarily partnered with Detective Jackie Curatola at the 54th Precinct. In 2012, Jackie took early retirement from the NYPD after starting to show signs of burning out.
 Detective Kate Lansing (Megan Ketch) – Assigned to replace Detective Curatola in 2012, Detective Kate Lansing worked with Danny for almost three months. She transferred back to Internal Affairs after the arrest of Captain Derek Elwood (Nestor Serrano), who framed Danny for possession of narcotics in order to prevent him from discovering his gambling problem.
 Detective Candice "Mac" McElroy (Megan Boone) – A temporary addition to the 54th Precinct, Detective Candice McElroy briefly served as Danny's partner in 2013.
 Detective First Grade Maria Baez (Marisa Ramirez) – Danny's partner since 2013, and someone he has known for almost 20 years. She previously spent three years with the Joint Bank Robbery Task Force until it was disbanded in 2011. Due to Reagan's long-standing positive relationship with Baez, fans have speculated as to whether they will become romantically involved.

References

Fictional New York City Police Department detectives
Blue Bloods (TV series)